The black-headed brushfinch (Arremon atricapillus) is a species of bird in the family Passerellidae.

Taxonomy
Until recently, the black-headed brushfinch was placed in the genus Buarremon.

The black-headed brushfinch was often treated as a subspecies of the stripe-headed brushfinch (A. torquatus), but the distributions of the two approach each other closely in Colombia with no evidence of intergradation. In addition, the Costa Rican brushfinch, A. costaricensis has often been treated as a subspecies of the stripe-headed brushfinch, or a subspecies of the black-headed brushfinch, but based on ecology, morphology, song, and molecular work, it has recently been suggested that A. costaricensis is worthy of treatment as a species. In that case, the black-headed brushfinch would only include the subspecies tacarcunae, and be restricted to Colombia and eastern Panama.

References

black-headed brush finch
Birds of Colombia
Birds of Panama
black-headed brush finch
black-headed brush finch